The Canton of Saint-Savinien is a former canton of the Charente-Maritime département, in France. It was disbanded following the French canton reorganisation which came into effect in March 2015. It consisted of 11 communes, which joined the canton of Saint-Jean-d'Angély in 2015. It had 7,511 inhabitants (2012). Its postal codes were 17350, 17380 and 17430. The lowest point is the river Charente near Bords (3 m), the highest point is near Fenioux (102 m). The canton seat was Saint-Savinien.

Communes

The canton comprised the following communes:

Annepont
Archingeay
Bords
Champdolent
Fenioux
Grandjean
Le Mung
Les Nouillers
Saint-Savinien
Taillant
Taillebourg

Population history

See also 
 Cantons of the Charente-Maritime department

References

Saint-Savinien
2015 disestablishments in France
States and territories disestablished in 2015